Peter Shaw is a former New Zealand international lawn bowler.

Bowls career
He won a bronze medal at the 1990 Commonwealth Games in the fours with Kevin Darling, Phil Skoglund and Stewart McConnell.

He won two gold medals in the pairs and fours at the 1997 Asia Pacific Bowls Championships. and also competed at the 1998 Commonwealth Games in Kuala Lumpur in Malaysia.

He won the 1997 singles title, 1998 pairs title and 1997 & 1998 fours title at the New Zealand National Bowls Championships when bowling for the Northern and North Palmerston Bowls Clubs.

Personal life
He is a company manager by trade.

References

Living people
1954 births
New Zealand male bowls players
Commonwealth Games medallists in lawn bowls
Commonwealth Games bronze medallists for New Zealand
Bowls players at the 1990 Commonwealth Games
20th-century New Zealand people
21st-century New Zealand people
Medallists at the 1990 Commonwealth Games